Victor Kiplangat (born 10 November 1999) is a Ugandan mountain runner who won one World Mountain Running Championships (2017).

In 2022 he won a gold medal at the Commonwealth Games in the men's marathon event, despite taking a wrong turn close to the end of the course.

Achievements

References

External links
 

1999 births
Living people
Place of birth missing (living people)
Ugandan mountain runners
Ugandan male long-distance runners
World Mountain Running Championships winners
20th-century Ugandan people
21st-century Ugandan people
Athletes (track and field) at the 2022 Commonwealth Games
Commonwealth Games gold medallists for Uganda
Commonwealth Games medallists in athletics
Medallists at the 2022 Commonwealth Games